George Ramsey Irvine  (February 1, 1948 – May 8, 2017) was an American professional basketball player and coach.  A 6'6" forward, Irvine played collegiately at the University of Washington, where he was a first-team All-Pac-8 selection in 1970. He was selected by the Seattle SuperSonics in the 8th round of the 1970 NBA Draft.  However, he never played for his hometown SuperSonics, nor for any other NBA team.  Instead, Irvine opted to play for the team that selected him in the American Basketball Association draft, the Virginia Squires.  Irvine played for the Squires for five seasons and then played a final pro season with the Denver Nuggets during the 1975-76 season, the ABA's final season prior to the ABA-NBA merger.

Irvine would later serve as head coach for two NBA teams; the Indiana Pacers, for two stints, and the Detroit Pistons. He was inducted into the Pac-12 Basketball Hall of Honor during the 2012 Pac-12 Conference men's basketball tournament, March 10, 2012. He died on May 8, 2017 at the age of 69 of cancer.

Head Coaching Record

|-
| style="text-align:left;"|Indiana
| style="text-align:left;"|
|82||22||60|||| style="text-align:center;"|4th in Atlantic||—||—||—||—
| style="text-align:center;"|Missed Playoffs
|-
| style="text-align:left;"|Indiana
| style="text-align:left;"|
|82||26||56|||| style="text-align:center;"|6th in Central||—||—||—||—
| style="text-align:center;"|Missed Playoffs
|-
| style="text-align:left;"|Indiana
| style="text-align:left;"|
|20||6||14|||| style="text-align:center;"|—||—||—||—||—
| style="text-align:center;"|—
|-
| style="text-align:left;"|Detroit
| style="text-align:left;"|
|24||14||10|||| style="text-align:center;"|4th in Central||3||0||3||
| style="text-align:center;"|Lost in First Round
|-
| style="text-align:left;"|Detroit
| style="text-align:left;"|
|82||32||50|||| style="text-align:center;"|5th in Central||—||—||—||—
| style="text-align:center;"|Missed Playoffs
|- class="sortbottom"
| style="text-align:left;"|Career
| ||290||100||190|||| ||3||0||3||

References

External links

 George Irvine playing statistics at basketball-reference.com
 George Irvine Coach Info at NBA.com

1948 births
2017 deaths
American men's basketball coaches
American men's basketball players
Ballard High School (Seattle, Washington) alumni
Basketball coaches from Washington (state)
Basketball players from Seattle
Deaths from cancer in Washington (state)
Denver Nuggets assistant coaches
Denver Nuggets players
Detroit Pistons assistant coaches
Detroit Pistons head coaches
Golden State Warriors assistant coaches
Indiana Pacers assistant coaches
Indiana Pacers head coaches
Seattle SuperSonics draft picks
Small forwards
Virginia Squires players
Washington Huskies men's basketball players